Lonhlupheko is a community in Lugongolweni inkhundla, Lubombo Region, eastern Eswatini. It is located on a major junction on the MR3 road, between Siteki and Mpaka. The area is semi-arid and vulnerable to drought.

References

Populated places in Eswatini